Pinnacles is an album by jazz trombonist and arranger J. J. Johnson recorded in 1979 for the Milestone label.

Reception

The Allmusic review by Scott Yanow observed "Although not quite an essential set, J.J. Johnson is in excellent form on this date". All About Jazz said "This is deep ‘Seventies funk, with block horns and lots of percussion. It’s also pretty generic – these guys are more at home playing jazz, and that’s what they should be playing".

Track listing
All compositions by J. J. Johnson except where noted.
 "Night Flight" - 7:46
 "Deak" - 6:26
 "Cannonball Junction" - 5:32
 "Pinnacles" - 6:40
 "See See Rider" (Traditional) - 6:46
 "Mr. Clean" (Weldon Irvine) - 5:46

Personnel 
J. J. Johnson - trombone, arranger
Oscar Brashear - trumpet (tracks 2, 3, 5 & 6)
Joe Henderson - tenor saxophone (tracks 1-4)
Tommy Flanagan - piano
Ron Carter - bass
Billy Higgins - drums
Kenneth Nash - percussion (tracks 5 & 6)

Use of Electronic Music Equipment 
From the liner notes:

"J.J. Johnson uses Barcus-Berry pickup, Gentle Electric pitch follower, and Roland Space Echo on "Cannonball Junction", and the same pickup and pitch follower, plus ARP 2600 Synthesizer and Oberheim Expander Module on "Mr. Clean."

References 

1980 albums
Milestone Records albums
J. J. Johnson albums